Anisogramma is a genus of fungi in the family Gnomoniaceae.  The genus contains three species. One of them, Anisogramma anomala, is the cause of eastern filbert blight.

References

External links
Anisogramma at Index Fungorum

Gnomoniaceae
Sordariomycetes genera